Agonica is a genus of beetles in the family Carabidae, containing the following species:

 Agonica ovalipennis Sloane, 1920
 Agonica simsoni Sloane, 1920
 Agonica victoriensis Moore, 1963

References

Panagaeinae